Marsel İlhan was the defending champion but decided not to participate.

2nd seed Blaž Kavčič claimed the title, defeating 1st seed Pere Riba 6–4, 6–1 in the final.

Seeds

Draw

Finals

Top half

Bottom half

References
 Main Draw
 Qualifying Draw

Banja Luka Challenger - Singles
2011 Singles